Michael V may refer to:

Michael V Kalaphates (1015–1042), Byzantine Emperor
Coptic Pope Michael V of Alexandria (fl. 1145–1146)
Michael V. (born 1969), Filipino actor and comedian